Cordova Township is located in Rock Island County, Illinois. As of the 2010 census, its population was 896 and it contained 399 housing units.

Geography

Demographics

References

External links

City-data.com
Illinois State Archives

Townships in Rock Island County, Illinois
Townships in Illinois